The 2001 Ole Miss Rebels football team represented the University of Mississippi during the 2001 NCAA Division I-A football season.

Schedule

Roster

References

Ole Miss Rebels
Ole Miss Rebels football seasons
Ole Miss Rebels football